Alaska Airlines Flight 261 was an Alaska Airlines flight of a McDonnell Douglas MD-83 plane that crashed into the Pacific Ocean on January 31, 2000, roughly  north of Anacapa Island, California, following a catastrophic loss of pitch control, killing all 88 on board: two pilots, three cabin crew members, and 83 passengers. The flight was a scheduled international passenger flight from Licenciado Gustavo Díaz Ordaz International Airport in Puerto Vallarta, Jalisco, Mexico, to Seattle–Tacoma International Airport near Seattle, Washington, United States, with an intermediate stop at San Francisco International Airport near San Francisco, California.

The subsequent investigation by the National Transportation Safety Board (NTSB) determined that inadequate maintenance led to excessive wear and eventual failure of a critical flight control system during flight. The probable cause was stated to be "a loss of airplane pitch control resulting from the in-flight failure of the horizontal stabilizer trim system jackscrew assembly's trapezoidal nut threads. The thread failure was caused by excessive wear resulting from Alaska Airlines' insufficient lubrication of the jackscrew assembly." For their heroic efforts to save the plane, the pilots were posthumously awarded and commemorated. The accident served as an inspiration for the fictionalized crash landing depicted in the 2012 movie Flight starring Denzel Washington.

Background

Aircraft 
The aircraft involved in the accident was a McDonnell-Douglas MD-83, serial number 53077, and registered as N963AS. The aircraft was the 1995th DC-9/MD80 family airframe built, was manufactured and delivered new to Alaska Airlines in 1992, and had logged 26,584 flight hours and 14,315 cycles before the crash.

Crew
The pilots of Flight 261 were both highly experienced aviators. Captain Theodore "Ted" Thompson, 53, had accrued 17,750 flight hours, and had more than 4,000 hours experience flying MD-80s. First Officer William "Bill" Tansky, 57, had accumulated 8,140 total flight hours, including about 8,060 hours as first officer in the MD-80. Thompson had flown for Alaska Airlines for 18 years and Tansky for 15; neither pilot had been involved in an accident or incident prior to the crash. Both pilots had previous military experience — Thompson in the U.S. Air Force and Tansky in the U.S. Navy. Three Seattle-based flight attendants were also on board, completing the five-person crew.

Passengers
The five crew members and 47 of the passengers on board the plane were bound for Seattle. Of the passengers, 30  were traveling to San Francisco; 3 were bound for Eugene, Oregon; and 3 passengers were headed for Fairbanks, Alaska. Of the passengers, one was Mexican and one was British, with all others being U.S. citizens.

At least 35 occupants of Flight 261 were connected in some manner with Alaska Airlines or its sister carrier Horizon Air, including 12 actual employees, leading many of the airline's personnel to mourn for those lost in the crash. Alaska Airlines stated that on less busy flights,  employees commonly filled seats that would otherwise have been left empty. Bouquets of flowers started arriving at the company's headquarters in SeaTac, Washington the day after the crash.

Notable passengers 
 Jean Gandesbery, author of the book Seven Mile Lake: Scenes from a Minnesota Life, died alongside her husband, Robert.
 Cynthia Oti, an investment broker and financial talk show host at San Francisco's KSFO-AM
 Tom Stockley, wine columnist for The Seattle Times, died alongside his wife Margaret
 Morris Thompson, commissioner of the Bureau of Indian Affairs in Alaska from 1973 to 1976, died alongside his wife Thelma and daughter Sheryl.

Accident flight

Initial flight segment

Alaska Airlines Flight 261 departed from Puerto Vallarta's Licenciado Gustavo Díaz Ordaz International Airport at 13:37 PST (21:37 UTC), and climbed to its intended cruising altitude of flight level 310. The plane was scheduled to land at San Francisco International Airport (SFO). Sometime before 15:49 (23:49 UTC), the flight crew contacted the airline's dispatch and maintenance-control facilities in SeaTac, Washington, on a company radio frequency shared with operations and maintenance facilities at Los Angeles International Airport (LAX), to discuss a jammed horizontal stabilizer and a possible diversion to LAX. The jammed stabilizer prevented the operation of the trim system, which would normally make slight adjustments to the flight control surfaces to keep the plane stable in flight. Neither the flight crew nor company maintenance could determine the cause of the jam. Repeated attempts to overcome the jam with the primary and alternate trim systems were unsuccessful.

During this time, the flight crew had several discussions with the company dispatcher about whether to divert to LAX or continue on as planned to SFO. Ultimately, the pilots chose to divert. Later, the NTSB found that while "the flight crew's decision to divert the flight to Los Angeles... was prudent and appropriate", "Alaska Airlines dispatch personnel appear to have attempted to influence the flight crew to continue to San Francisco... instead of diverting to Los Angeles". Cockpit voice recorder (CVR) transcripts indicate that the dispatcher was concerned about the effect on the schedule ("flow"), should the flight divert.

First dive and recovery

At 16:09 (00:09 UTC), the flight crew successfully used the primary trim system to unjam the stuck horizontal stabilizer. Upon being freed, however, it quickly moved to an extreme "nose-down" position, forcing the aircraft into an almost vertical nosedive.

Alaska 261 informed air traffic control (ATC) of their control problems. After the flight crew stated their intention to land at LAX, ATC asked whether they wanted to proceed to a lower altitude in preparation for the approach. The captain replied: "I need to get down to about ten, change my configuration, make sure I can control the jet and I'd like to do that out here over the bay if I may." Later, during the public hearings into the accident, the request by the pilot not to overfly populated areas was mentioned. During this time, the flight crew considered, and rejected, any further attempts to correct the runaway trim. They descended to a lower altitude and started to configure the aircraft for landing at LAX.

Second dive and crash

Beginning at 16:19 (00:19 UTC), the CVR recorded the sounds of at least four distinct "thumps", followed 17 seconds later by an "extremely loud noise", as the overstrained jackscrew assembly failed completely and the jackscrew separated from the acme nut holding it in place. The crippled plane had been given a block altitude, and several aircraft in the vicinity had been alerted by ATC to maintain visual contact with the stricken jet. These aircraft immediately contacted the controller. One pilot radioed, "That plane has just started to do a big huge plunge." Another reported, "Yes sir, ah, I concur. He is, uh, definitely in a nose down, uh, position, descending quite rapidly." ATC then tried to contact the plane. The crew of a SkyWest airliner reported, "He's, uh, definitely out of control." Although the CVR captured the co-pilot saying "mayday", no radio communications were received from the flight crew during the final event.

The CVR transcript reveals the pilots' constant attempts for the duration of the dive to regain control of the aircraft. After the jackscrew failed, the plane pitched down -70 degrees and was rolling over to the left. Performing an upset recovery maneuver, the captain commanded to "push and roll, push and roll," managing to increase the pitch to -28 degrees, he stated, "ok, we are inverted...and now we gotta get it." Over the next minute, completely inverted and still diving at a -9 degree pitch, the crew struggled to roll the plane, with the captain calling to "push push push...push the blue side up," "ok now lets kick rudder...left rudder left rudder", to which the copilot responded, "I can't reach it". The captain then replied "ok right rudder...right rudder," followed 18 seconds later by "gotta get it over again...at least upside down we're flying."

Despite the attempt to fly the plane inverted, which almost entirely arrested its descent, the aircraft had lost too much altitude in the dive and was far beyond recovery. At this time, pilots from aircraft flying in the vicinity reported in, with one pilot saying, "and he's just hit the water." Another reported, "Ah, yes sir, he, ah, he, ah, hit the water. He's, ah, down." The aircraft was destroyed by the impact forces, and all occupants on board were killed by blunt-force impact trauma.

Investigation

Wreckage recovery and analysis

Using side-scan sonar, remotely operated vehicles, and a commercial fishing trawler, workers recovered about 85% of the fuselage (including the tail section) and a majority of the wing components. In addition, both engines, as well as the flight data recorder (FDR) and CVR were retrieved. All wreckage recovered from the crash site was unloaded at the Seabees' Naval Construction Battalion Center Port Hueneme, California, for examination and documentation by NTSB investigators. Both the horizontal stabilizer trim system jackscrew (also referred to as "acme screw") and the corresponding acme nut, through which the jackscrew turns, were found. The acme nut was constructed from a softer copper alloy containing aluminum, nickel, and bronze. As the jackscrew rotates, it moves up or down through the (fixed) acme nut, and this linear motion moves the horizontal stabilizer for the trim system. Upon subsequent examination, the jackscrew was found to have metallic filaments wrapped around it, which were later determined to be the remains of the acme-nut thread.

The later analysis estimated that 90% of the thread in the acme nut had already worn away previously and that it had finally stripped out during the flight while en route to San Francisco. Once the thread had failed, the horizontal stabilizer assembly was subjected to aerodynamic forces that it was not designed to withstand, leading to the complete failure of the overstressed stabilizer assembly. Over the course of the investigation, the NTSB considered a number of potential reasons for the substantial amount of deterioration of the nut thread on the jackscrew assembly, including the substitution by Alaska Airlines (with the approval of the aircraft manufacturer McDonnell Douglas) of Aeroshell 33 grease instead of the previously approved lubricant, Mobilgrease 28. It was found that the use of Aeroshell 33 was not a factor in this accident. Insufficient lubrication of the components was also considered as a reason for the wear. Examination of the jackscrew and acme nut revealed that no effective lubrication was present on these components at the time of the accident. Ultimately, the lack of lubrication of the acme-nut thread and the resultant excessive wear were determined to be the direct causes of the accident. Both of these circumstances resulted from Alaska Airlines' attempts to cut costs.

Identification of passengers
Due to the extreme impact forces, only a few bodies were found intact, and none were visually identifiable. All passengers were identified using fingerprints, dental records, tattoos, personal items, and anthropological examination.

Inadequate lubrication and end-play checks
The investigation then proceeded to examine why scheduled maintenance had failed to adequately lubricate the jackscrew assembly. In interviews with the Alaska Airlines mechanic at SFO, who last performed the lubrication, the task was shown to take about one hour, whereas the aircraft manufacturer estimated the task should take four hours. This and other evidence suggested to the NTSB that "the SFO mechanic who was responsible for lubricating the jackscrew assembly in September 1999 did not adequately perform the task". Laboratory tests indicated that the excessive wear of the jackscrew assembly could not have accumulated in just the four-month period between the September 1999 maintenance and the accident flight. Therefore, the NTSB concluded that "more than just the last lubrication was missed or inadequately performed".

A periodic maintenance inspection called an "end-play check" was used to monitor wear on the jackscrew assembly. The NTSB examined why the last end-play check on the accident aircraft in September 1997 did not uncover excessive wear. The investigation found that Alaska Airlines had fabricated tools to be used in the end-play check that did not meet the manufacturer's requirements. Testing revealed that the nonstandard tools ("restraining fixtures") used by Alaska Airlines could result in inaccurate measurements and that if accurate measurements had been obtained at the time of the last inspection, these measurements possibly would have indicated the excessive wear and the need to replace the affected components.

Extension of maintenance intervals
Between 1985 and 1996, Alaska Airlines progressively increased the period between both jackscrew lubrication and end-play checks, with the approval of the Federal Aviation Administration (FAA). Since each lubrication or end-play check subsequently not conducted had represented an opportunity to adequately lubricate the jackscrew or detect excessive wear, the NTSB examined the justification of these extensions. In the case of extended lubrication intervals, the investigation could not determine what information, if any, was presented by Alaska Airlines to the FAA prior to 1996. Testimony from an FAA inspector regarding an extension granted in 1996 was that Alaska Airlines submitted documentation from McDonnell Douglas as justification for their extension.

End-play checks were conducted during a periodic comprehensive airframe overhaul process called a "C‑check". Testimony from the director of reliability and maintenance programs of Alaska Airlines was that a data-analysis package based on the maintenance history of five sample aircraft was submitted to the FAA to justify the extended period between C-checks. Individual maintenance tasks (such as the end-play check) were not separately considered in this extension. The NTSB found, "Alaska Airlines' end play check interval extension should have been, but was not, supported by adequate technical data to demonstrate that the extension would not present a potential hazard".

FAA oversight
A special inspection conducted by the NTSB in April 2000 of Alaska Airlines uncovered widespread significant deficiencies that "the FAA should have uncovered earlier". The investigation concluded, "FAA surveillance of Alaska Airlines had been deficient for at least several years". The NTSB noted that in July 2001, an FAA panel determined that Alaska Airlines had corrected the previously identified deficiencies. However, several factors led the board to question "the depth and effectiveness of Alaska Airlines corrective actions" and "the overall adequacy of Alaska Airlines' maintenance program".

Systemic problems were identified by the investigation into the FAA's oversight of maintenance programs, including inadequate staffing, its approval process of maintenance interval extensions, and the aircraft certification requirements.

Aircraft design and certification issues
The jackscrew assembly was designed with two independent threads, each of which was strong enough to withstand the forces placed on it. Maintenance procedures such as lubrication and end-play checks were to catch any excessive wear before it progressed to a point of failure of the system. The aircraft designers assumed that at least one set of threads would always be present to carry the loads placed on it; therefore, the effects of catastrophic failure of this system were not considered, and no "fail-safe" provisions were needed.

For this design component to be approved ("certified") by the FAA without any fail-safe provision, a failure had to be considered "extremely improbable". This was defined as "having a probability on the order of 1 or less each flight hour". The accident showed that certain wear mechanisms could affect both sets of threads and that the wear might not be detected. The NTSB determined that the design of "the horizontal stabilizer jackscrew assembly did not account for the loss of the acme nut threads as a catastrophic single-point failure mode".

Jackscrew design improvement
In 2001, the National Aeronautics and Space Administration (NASA) recognized the risk to its hardware (such as the Space Shuttle) attendant upon the use of similar jackscrews. An engineering fix developed by engineers of NASA and United Space Alliance promises to make progressive failures easy to see and thus complete failures of a jackscrew less likely.

John Liotine
In 1998, an Alaska Airlines mechanic named John Liotine, who worked in the Alaska Airlines maintenance center in Oakland, California, told the FAA that supervisors were approving records of maintenance that they were not allowed to approve or that indicated work had been completed when, in fact, it had not. Liotine began working with federal investigators by secretly audio recording his supervisors. On December 22, 1998, federal authorities raided an Alaska Airlines property and seized maintenance records. In August 1999, Alaska Airlines put Liotine on paid leave, and in 2000, Liotine filed a libel suit against the airline. The crash of AS261 became a part of the federal investigation against Alaska Airlines, because, in 1997, Liotine had recommended that the jackscrew and gimbal nut of the accident aircraft be replaced, but had been overruled by another supervisor. In December 2001, federal prosecutors stated that they were not going to file criminal charges against Alaska Airlines. Around that time, Alaska Airlines agreed to settle the libel suit by paying about $500,000; as part of the settlement, Liotine resigned.

Aftermath

After the crash, Alaska Airlines management said that it hoped to handle the aftermath in a manner similar to that conducted by Swissair after the Swissair Flight 111 accident. They wished to avoid the mistakes made by Trans World Airlines in the aftermath of the TWA Flight 800 accident, in other words, TWA's failure to provide timely information and compassion to the families of the victims.

The victims' families approved the construction of a memorial sundial, designed by Santa Barbara artist James "Bud" Bottoms, which was placed at Port Hueneme on the California coast. The names of each of the victims are engraved on individual bronze plates mounted on the perimeter of the dial. The sundial casts a shadow on a memorial plaque at 16:22 each January 31.

Captain Thompson and First Officer Tansky were both posthumously awarded the Air Line Pilots Association Gold Medal for Heroism, in recognition of their actions during the emergency. This is the only time the award has ever been given posthumously. The Ted Thompson/Bill Tansky Scholarship Fund was named in memory of the two pilots.

Both McDonnell Douglas and Alaska Airlines eventually accepted liability for the crash, and all but one of the lawsuits brought by surviving family members were settled out of court before going to trial. While the financial terms of settlements had not been officially disclosed, The Seattle Times reported the total amount to be in excess of US$300 million, covered entirely by insurance, which at the time was among the largest payouts in modern aviation history. Candy Hatcher of the Seattle Post-Intelligencer wrote: "Many lost faith in Alaska Airlines, a homegrown company that had taken pride in its safety record and billed itself as a family airline."

Steve Miletich of The Seattle Times wrote that the western portion of Washington  "had never before experienced such a loss from a plane crash". Many residents of Seattle had been deeply affected by the disaster. As part of a memorial vigil in 2000, a column of light was beamed from the top of the Space Needle. Students and faculty at the John Hay Elementary School in Queen Anne, Seattle, held a memorial for four Hay students who were killed in the crash.  In April 2001, John Hay Elementary dedicated the "John Hay Pathway Garden" as a permanent memorial to the students and their families who were killed on Flight 261. The City of Seattle public park Soundview Terrace was renovated in honor of the four Pearson and six Clemetson family members who were killed on board Flight 261 from the same Seattle neighborhood of Queen Anne. The park's playground was named "Rachel's Playground", in memory of six-year-old Rachel Pearson, who was on board the MD-83 and who was often seen playing at the park.

Two victims were falsely named in paternity suits as the fathers of children in Guatemala in an attempt to gain insurance and settlement money. Subsequent DNA testing proved these claims to be false.

The crash has appeared in various advance fee fraud ("419") email scams, in which a scammer uses the name of someone who died in the crash to lure unsuspecting victims into sending money to the scammer by claiming the crash victim left huge amounts of unclaimed funds in a foreign bank account. The names of Morris Thompson and Ronald and Joyce Lake were used in schemes unrelated to them.

As of May 2022, Flight 261 no longer exists, and Alaska Airlines no longer operates the Puerto Vallarta–San Francisco–Seattle/Tacoma route. Alaska Airlines now flies from Puerto Vallarta–Seattle/Tacoma nonstop with Flight 127 and Puerto Vallarta—San Francisco nonstop with Flight 1273.  The airline retired the last of its MD-80s in 2008 and now uses Boeing 737s and Airbus A320s for these routes.

In popular culture
In the Canadian TV series Mayday, the flight was featured in the season-one (2003) Cutting Corners episode (called Air Emergency and Air Disasters in the U.S. and Air Crash Investigation in the UK and elsewhere around the world). The dramatization was broadcast in the United States with the title "Fatal Error". The flight was also included in a Mayday season-six (2007) Science of Disaster special titled "Fatal Flaw", which was called "Fatal Fix" in the United Kingdom, Australia and Asia. The crash was covered again (with an entirely new cast) in season 22, episode 5 of Mayday, titled "Pacific Plunge".
 The film drama Flight (2012) featured an airplane crash of an aircraft resembling an MD-83, which flies inverted and ultimately crash-lands, though the film's version recorded just six fatalities (four passengers, two crew) of the 102 persons aboard. In the film, NTSB investigators determine the probable cause of this crash to be the fatigue of a jackscrew due to excess wear and poor maintenance. The final seconds of the CVR of Flight 261 indicates the plane stabilized and was flying inverted shortly before the crash, an event depicted in the film. Screenwriter John Gatins later explained that the film's featured crash was "loosely inspired" by the events of Flight 261.

Maps

See also

 Aeroflot Flight 8641 – another accident resulting from a jackscrew failure
 Emery Worldwide Flight 17
Air Moorea Flight 1121
United Airlines Flight 585
Lion Air Flight 610
Delta Air Lines Flight 1080, another case where an improperly greased stabilizer jammed.

References

External links

 NTSB Final Report
 
Alaska Airlines news reports about 261 (Archive)
 Cockpit voice recorder transcript and accident summary
 Families of Alaska Airlines Flight 261
"Navy expands search for debris at Alaska Airlines Flight 261 crash scene", United States Navy (Archive)
Applying Lessons Learned from Accidents, Alaska Airlines Flight 261 – Informative analysis at faa.gov, with technical diagrams and photos (Archive)
 Federal Aviation Administration – Lessons Learned Home: Alaska Airlines Flight 261
Seattle Post-Intelligencer special report (Archive)
Short Bios of Flight 261 Passengers

261
Airliner accidents and incidents caused by maintenance errors
Airliner accidents and incidents caused by mechanical failure
Aviation accidents and incidents in the United States in 2000
Disasters in California
2000 in California
Accidents and incidents involving the McDonnell Douglas MD-83
Airliner accidents and incidents in California
Articles containing video clips
January 2000 events in the United States
Aviation accidents and incidents caused by loss of control